Huojia County is a county under the administration of the prefecture-level city of Xinxiang, in the northwest of Henan province, China.

The name Huojia, which means "capturing [Lü] Jia", was used as the county name in 111 BC when Emperor Wu of Han, who on his royal progress at this place,  heard Han forces had captured Lü Jia –prime minister of Nanyue kingdom– in the Han–Nanyue War.

Administrative divisions
As 2012, this county is divided to 9 towns, 2 townships and 1 other.
Towns

Townships
Weizhuang Township
Daxinzhuang Township

Others
Xigong District Administrative Committee

Climate

References

 
County-level divisions of Henan
Xinxiang